Welcome to Paradise may refer to:

Film and television
 "Welcome to Paradise" (The Vampire Diaries), an episode of the television series The Vampire Diaries
 Welcome to Paradise, a 2007 film starring Crystal Bernard

Radio and Podcasts
 Welcome to Paradise, a 2022 CBC Radio podcast by Anna Maria Tremonti

Music
 Welcome to Paradise (album), by Randy Stonehill, 1976
 Welcome to Paradise, album by NorthTale, 2019
 "Welcome to Paradise", a song by Green Day, 1994
 "Welcome to Paradise", a song by John Waite from the album Mask of Smiles, 1985
 "Welcome to Paradise", a song by Front 242 from the album Front by Front, 1988
 Welcome to Paradise (tour), a concert tour by Cody Simpson